Eusebius of Alexandria is an author to whom certain extant homilies are attributed.

Biography
Nothing is known of the author. In all events, he was not a patriarch of Alexandria, as is affirmed in an early biography, written by one Johannes, a notary, and stating that Eusebius was called by Cyril to be his successor in the episcopate.

There has been much dispute regarding the details of his life and the age in which he lived. Galland (Vet. Patr. Biblioth., VIII, 23) says: "de Eusebio qui vulgo dicitur episcopus Alexandræ incerta omnia" (Concerning Eusebius, commonly called bishop of Alexandria there is nothing sure). His writings have been attributed to Eusebius of Emesa, Eusebius of Cæsarea, and others. According to an old biography said to have been written by his notary, the monk John, and discovered by Cardinal Mai, he lived in the fifth century and led a monastic life near Alexandria. The fame of his virtues attracted the attention of Cyril, Bishop of Alexandria, who visited him with his clergy, and in 444, when dying, had him elected his successor, and consecrated him bishop, though much against his will. Eusebius displayed great zeal in the exercise of his office and did much good by his preaching. Among those he converted was a certain Alexander, a man of senatorial rank. After having ruled his see for seven or, according to another account, for twenty years, he made Alexander his successor and retired to the desert, whence Cyril had summoned him and there died in the odor of sanctity.

While Mai seems to have established the existence of a Eusebius of Alexandria who lived in the fifth century, it had been objected than neither the name of Eusebius or his successor Alexander, appears in the list of the occupants of that ancient see. Dioscurus is mentioned as the immediate successor of Cyril. Nor does the style of the homilies seem on the whole in keeping with the age of Cyril. It may be noted, however, that the biographer of Eusebius expressly states that the Cyril in question is the great opponent of Nestorius. Various solution of the difficulty have been proposed. Thilo thinks that the authorship of the homilies is to be assigned either to a certain monk – one of four brothers 3 of the fifth century, or to a presbyter and court chaplain of Justinian I, who took an active part in the theological strifes of the sixth century. Mai suggests that after the death of Cyril, there were two bishops at Alexandria, Dioscurus, the Monophysite leader, and Eusebius, the head of the Catholic party. The homilies cover a variety of subjects, and the author is one of the earliest patristic witnesses to the doctrine regarding the descent of Christ into Hell. A list of homilies with the complete text is given by Mai. They may also be found in Migne, which was published with an introduction by Rand in "Modern Philology", II, 261.

Works
These homilies enjoyed some renown in the Eastern Church in the sixth and seventh centuries.

The discourses belong probably to the fifth or sixth century, and possibly originated in Alexandria. They deal with the life of Jesus of Nazareth and with questions of ecclesiastical life and practise, which they resolve in a monastic-ascetic way. Their literary character is not quite clear; while most of them are adapted for public delivery, not a few bear the character of ecclesiastical pronouncements. They are now in print except four included among John Chrysostom's works. The fragments preserved in the so-called Sacra parallela are to be found in Karl Holl's Fragmente vornicänischer Kirchenväter. A homily concerning the observance of Sunday is attributed by Zahn to Eusebius of Emesa.

Notes

References

 

Byzantine theologians
Year of birth missing
Year of death missing
6th-century Byzantine people
Byzantine writers
Ancient Alexandrians
6th-century Byzantine writers
6th-century Christian theologians